Plasma coblation is a tonsillectomy procedure  which involves the removal of tissue through radio frequency wavelengths. Coblation (derived from “Controlled ablation” meaning the removal of tissue in a controlled manner) techniques have been present since the 1950s and have been developed so that errors can be removed to achieve a surgical techniques that is free from both defects and negative affects.

This technique has revolutionized modern medicine in-order to achieve efficient surgical procedures with little complications as possible. It is widely used in medical research areas today such as biochemical engineering and microbiology which have allowed for the development and advancement of many surgical devices.

This process consists of five stages, which is significantly less than the traditional tonsillectomy method therefore allowing the technique of Plasma Coblation to the overall time required for the typical procedure, however there are also negatives associated with the device. which indicate that there is no clear advantage or difference in comparison to traditional surgical techniques today.

History 
Electric surgical equipment was developed in the 1950. They provided a revolutionized way of using high frequency wavelengths in order to disintegrate unwanted cell matter. First it began with the use of radio frequency passing through the devices medium. Its development throughout the years began which was the experimentation with higher and more efficient plasma frequency made up of charged ions to target unwanted matter in the arteries.

The discovery of the coblation procedure was by both Philip Eggers and Hira Thapliyal. This discovery was made in order to develop the surgical techniques for treatment of artery blockages. Over time experiments were conducted to determine the success of the device in comparison to the standard method for surgical tonsillectomy. After undergoing many trails and experiments, the success of the device was determined which allowed them to be used as a typical surgical technique. This resulted in Coblation procedures to become developed in the mid 1990s and it become more widely spread when health companies adopted the techniques in order to minimise their costs in the long run, and use a faster surgical technique.

Current use 
Plasma coblation is widely used in the medical world as a successful surgical technique. The technique is used as a method of treating tonsillectomy and adenoidectomy which is the surgical removement of tonsils and soft tissue found towards the back of a nose which causes blockage. This piece of equipment is also being used in the field of microbiology in-order to assist in the removal of microbial infections, bacteria and certain viruses which affect the system of living organisms. Other fields that Coblation is currently used in would involve chemical and bio engineering which allows for the development of such surgical equipment to remove infected soft tissue through the use of radio and plasma frequency.

Although the technique of plasma coblation is not more widespread than the traditional tonsillectomy procedure it is still classified as an approved surgical technique, which has been implemented around the world in different countries. Plasma Coblation is still not the main used procedure due to its unknown disadvantages compared to current procedures and equipment, however its advantages and ability to decrease post operative pain and hospital stay has been ensured over the standard surgical procedures currently in use today.

Surgical procedure 
The Coblation technology involves various key features which allow it to minimize heat damage caused to tissue during a surgical procedure. It is made up of three wires which contain electrodes for efficiently conducting the surgical procedure. More of its features include coordinated suction ports which allows for its ease of use, and a long pliable metal wand for easily targeting tissues to be removed. One of the main features include the saline solution which is used in-order to take advantage of the ionized particles to accurately target any infected and damaged tissue to be removed by the device.

When conducting surgical procedures with a plasma Coblation device, it consists of five stages. The procedure begins with the first stage by setting up the apparatus through the dissipation of heat throughout the device in-order to prevent direct heat emissions and decrease overall thermal effect of the device. The second step involves the removal of the infected or unwanted tissue of the device by targeting the area for the procedure. As the removal of the tissue occur the third step then involves of reducing the power of the electrode to avoid collateral damage to the tissue. Then finally the fourth and fifth step are conducted after the tissue has been removed, which then requires  the dispersion of electron power and thermal energy within the device to avoid further damage to healthy tissue.

Assessment 
Plasma coblation is used mainly for procedures performed in the ENT surgical areas, which has allowed for the overall improvement of surgical procedures such as tonsillectomy allowing multiple benefits to both its patients and surgeons. However there are also some negative affects associated with the surgical device which have resulted in less wider use of the procedure around the world when compared to the safer traditional method. Overall there has been no clear difference or advantage over other surgical techniques/procedures that are performed in today's surgeries.

Advantages 

There are multiple advantages of plasma coblation compared to the standard tonsillectomy procedure which include:
 Requires less surgical time for the procedure to be completed.
 Largely minimise thermal damage which occur to surrounding tissue during the procedure compared to the traditional method.
 Faster recovery of the procedure as it is classified as a minimally-invasive surgical method as it utilise radio frequency compared to incisions in the body.
 Less operative pain as no incision is required to perform the procedure.

Disadvantages 
Although there are various advantages associated with plasma coblation, the procedure also contains disadvantages which allow the traditional surgery for tonsillectomy to be preferred. Some of which are:
 Small field of view when removing tissue.
 Little depth perception.
 Poor mobility of removing tissue within the surgical site.
 Requires higher standards of safety procedures to be followed. If not followed carefully and specifically, excess burning to healthy tissue could occur.

References 

Tonsil
Surgical removal procedures